Jerudong Park Medical Centre is a private hospital in Brunei-Muara District, Brunei Darussalam which mainly provides specialized healthcare services. It is located in Jerudong, some 20 kilometres from Bandar Seri Begawan. The hospital also houses Gleneagles JPMC.

Location 
Jerudong Park Medical Centre is situated not far from Jerudong Park, a well-known family recreational centre-cum-amusement park in Brunei. The hospital complex is located at the coast overlooking South China Sea. It is also close to BRIDEX International Conference Centre.

Services 
Jerudong Park Medical Centre primarily provides specialised outpatient and inpatient clinical services, among them dermatology, gastroenterology, histopathology, nephrology, occupational health, psychology, dental, obstetrics and gynaecology, and paediatrics. Surgical services are also available for cases such as of the ear, nose and throat (ENT); implantology; ophthalmology; plastic and reconstructive; orthopaedics; general, paediatrics and laparoscopic, and urology. There are also auxiliary services such as laboratory, diagnostic imaging and radiology.

Gleneagles JPMC 
Gleneagles JPMC is a dedicated centre within the hospital which provides healthcare services to cardiac patients. The centre was established on 15 July 2002 and began operational on 8 August 2002. Its establishment is a joint venture between the Government of Brunei Darussalam and Parkway Pantai Limited, a regional private healthcare groups based in Singapore. The latter owns and handles the operation of Gleneagles JPMC.

Accreditation 
Jerudong Park Medical Centre is accredited by the Joint Commission International since 2004.

See also 
List of hospitals in Brunei

References

External links
Jerudong Park Medical Centre official website 
Gleneagles JPMC website
Ministry of Health, Brunei Darussalam

Hospitals in Brunei
Hospitals with year of establishment missing